WPFP (980 AM) is a radio station broadcasting a variety hits format. Licensed to Park Falls, Wisconsin, United States, the station is currently owned by The Marks Group through licensee Park Falls Community Broadcasting Corporation.

History
WPFP changed their format from sports talk to conservative talk on July 1, 2010. The station broadcast as WNBI from 1968 to 2010, when it reverted to its original call sign.

On October 22, 2018, WPFP changed their format from talk to variety hits, branded as "103.1 Jack FM" (simulcast on FM translator W276DJ 103.1 FM Park Falls).

References

External links

PFP
Jack FM stations
Adult hits radio stations in the United States
Radio stations established in 1953
1953 establishments in Wisconsin